Benjamin Castaldi (born 28 March 1970) is a French television host, columnist, radio host and producer. He is the former host of Secret Story which is a spinoff of Loft Story that he hosted as well.

Biography

Family

Benjamin Castaldi was born into a family of artists, being the son of actress and writer Catherine Allégret and actor Jean-Pierre Castaldi. He grew up surrounded by his grandmother, actress Simone Signoret, his grandfather, director Yves Allégret, and the adoptive father of his mother, actor and singer Yves Montand. He has a maternal half-sister, Clémentine Vaudaux and two paternal half-siblings, Giovanni and Paola. He is of Italian and Polish-Jewish descent.

Studies and professional debut

In the late 1980s, Benjamin Castaldi, who then aspired to become a businessman, began studies in economics at Sorbonne University. He then applied for a position in a home meal delivery company, where he was finally hired as a salesperson. He then became director of the company, which ended up filing bankruptcy. Wishing to try his luck as a music producer, he moved to the United States where he tried to relaunch the career of singer Esther Galil. After this failed, in 1993, he returned to Paris. Meanwhile, in 1992, he participated as an "anonymous" candidate in the game Que le meilleur gagne presented by Nagui on La Cinq.

Private life

He married on 22 September 1993 in Saint-Mandé to Valérie Sapienza, the mother of his sons Julien (born 18 September 1996) and Simon (born 20 April 2000). They divorced in 2001. On 21 September 2002, he married the television and radio host Flavie Flament who he met in December 2000 on the show Les P'tits Princes, on TF1). Castaldi has a son with her, Enzo (born 8 February 2004). They separated in December 2006 before divorcing in July 2008. On 24 November 2011, he married journalist and television host Vanessa Broussouloux in Copenhagen, Denmark. They divorced in May 2016 and on 27 August of the same year he married an interview director of the company Endemol, Aurore Aleman, met in 2015.

His eldest son Julien joined The Mad Mag on NRJ12 as a columnist in 2017.

On 22 November 2017, he revealed on the plateau of Touche pas à mon poste ! having had a three-day affair with the French journalist Annie Lemoine.

Motorcycle accident

On Saturday, 23 June 2012 it was reported that Benjamin Castaldi suffered and accident that caused him a collarbone fracture as well as two broken ribs. He left the hospital the following day. At the time of his accident he was hosting the French reality-series Secret Story which led to the decision that television presenter Nikos Aliagas hosted the show while everybody waited for Castaldi's return. Benjamin returned on air on Monday, 2 July, but normality was soon interrupted. It turned out that he had six broken ribs, and his collarbone had not healed properly, he was operated with urgency. The Voice of Secret Story took over the hosting of the show.

Financial Issues

In 2012, he discovered that he was ruined and  claimed to be a victim of a real estate scam of the financial consulting company Apollonia. In 2017 Benjamin said he couldn't buy Christmas presents or do fun activities with his children anymore.

In December 2014, he publicly declared himself a victim of a scam that involved a notary, a promoter and a bank. He claimed six million euros in court for compensation of damages he suffered.

Career
 1994–1997: Studio Gabriel with Michel Drucker / France 2
 1997–1998: L'Étoffe des ados / La Cinquième 
 1997–1998: Drucker'N Co / France 2
 1998: Le rendez-vous / La Cinquième
 1998: Fous d'humour / France 2 
 1998–1999: Vivement dimanche with Michel Drucker / France 2
 1999: Célébrités / TF1 with Carole Rousseau and Stéphane Bern
 2000: Les P'tits Princes / TF1 with Carole Rousseau, Sophie Thalmann, Frédéric Joly and Flavie Flament
 2001–2002: Loft Story (seasons 1–2) / M6
 2002: Popstars, spéciale L5 / M6 
 2002–2003: QI, Le Grand Test (editions 1 – 2) / M6 with Mac Lesggy
 2002–2003: Absolument 80, Absolument 70, Absolument Été / M6
 2002: Mémoire, Le Grand Test / M6 with Mac Lesggy
 2003–2006: Nouvelle Star (seasons 1–4) / M6 
 2003: Tous les oppose / M6
 2003: Culture générale, Le Grand Test / M6 : with Mac Lesggy
 2004: Permis de conduire, Le Grand Test / M6 with Mac Lesggy
 2004: Le Pensionnat de Chavagnes : Ils disent tout ! / M6 with Mac Lesggy
 2005: Totale Impro / M6
 2006: Johnny Hallyday, Flashback Tour 2006 in Bercy / TF1
 2006: Les 40 couples stars qui ont marqué les Français / TF1 with Flavie Flament
 2006–2007: Langues de VIP / TF1 
 2007–2008: 1 contre 100 /TF1
 2007: Les 30 destins de stars les plus incroyables / TF1
 2007: Les Rois du Système D / TF1 – with Églantine Éméyé
 2007: Incroyables Destins / TF1
 2007–2014: Secret Story (seasons 1-8) / TF1
 2007–2011: Le Grand Quiz du cerveau (editions 1–5) / TF1 with Carole Rousseau
 2007–2008: Le Grand Music Quiz (editions 1–2) / TF1
 2008: 9e cérémonie des NRJ Music Awards / TF1 
 2008: Qui peut battre Benjamin Castaldi ? / TF1 – with Carole Rousseau and Denis Brogniart 
 2009: Mes parents vont t'adorer / NRJ 12 
 2010: La Ferme Célébrités en Afrique / TF1 - with Jean-Pierre Foucault
 2010: Qui peut battre Philippe Lucas ? / TF1
 2010: Les Stars se dépassent pour Ela / TF1
 2011: La vie de Vynzkozy / NRJ 12
 2012: La Roue de la fortune / TF1 with Valérie Bègue
 2012: You Can Dance / NT1 
 2014: Tahiti Quest / Gulli 
 2014: The Winner Is / TF1
 2015: Nouvelle Star / D8 
 2015: L'Académie des neuf / NRJ 12 
 2015: Super Million Question / NRJ 12
 2016: Equidia Life Academy / Equidia Life
 2016–present: Touche pas à mon poste ! / C8 
 2016: Hold Up / C8 
 2016: Big Buzz Quiz / C8 
 2017: TPMP ! Castaldi vs. Delormeau : qui sera le meilleur animateur ? / C8 
 2017: TPMP ! Les paris sont lancés / C8 
 2017: Cash Island / C8
 2017: TPMP, le jeu : C'est que de l'amour ! / C8
 2017: Paris à nous les Jeux ! Le grand concert / C8 : with Hervé Mathoux and Marie Portolano
 2017: Family Battle / C8 
 2017: La Magie selon Guényanimée par Maxime Guény / C8 
 2018: La Télé même l'été ! / C8 
 2018: TPMP ! Ouvert à tous / C8 
 2018: TPMP refait la semaine / C8
 2018: TPMP fait son bêtisier ! / C8 with Kelly Vedovelli
 2019: TPMP : les 10 plus gros clashs à la télé / C8
 2019: TPMP : les 20 émissions préférées des Français / C8

References

1970 births
Living people
French television presenters
French people of Italian descent
People from Boulogne-Billancourt
French people of Polish-Jewish descent